LA-7 or LA 7 can refer to:
Television series L.A. 7
WWII Soviet aircraft La-7
La7, Italian Television channel
La 7 (Castile and León), Spanish television channel in Castile and León
La 7 (Region of Murcia), Spanish television channel in Region of Murcia
LaSiete, former Spanish Television channel
Louisiana's 7th congressional district
Louisiana Highway 7